
Krapkowice County is a unit of territorial administration and local government (powiat) in Opole Voivodeship, south-western Poland. It came into being on January 1, 1999, as a result of the Polish local government reforms passed in 1998.

As of 2006 its total population is 67,926, out of which the population of Krapkowice is 16,301, that of Zdzieszowice is 11,445, that of Gogolin is 6,682, and the rural population is 29,429.

Neighbouring counties
Krapkowice County is bordered by Opole County to the north, Strzelce County to the east, Kędzierzyn-Koźle County to the south-east and Prudnik County to the west.

Administrative division
The county is subdivided into five gminas (three urban-rural and two rural). These are listed in the following table, in descending order of population.

References

 
Krapkowice